Scott Hotham (born July 19, 1984) is a Canadian professional ice hockey defenseman who most recently played for Brantford Blast in the ACH. He previously played with Cardiff Devils in the British EIHL.

Playing career
Hotham played major junior hockey in the Ontario Hockey League and played college hockey with Saint Mary's University. In 2005, Hotham played two games with the Rockford IceHogs of the UHL, but did not play his first full season of professional hockey until the 2009–10 season, which he played primarily in the ECHL with the Florida Everblades.

Hotham played a season (2016/17) in the UK with EIHL side Cardiff Devils alongside his brother Andrew, helping the Devils to a league and cup double.

He has since had spells with ACH sides Stoney Creek Generals and Brantford Blast.

Family
Scott Hotham a son of the former National Hockey League defenceman Greg Hotham who played with the Toronto Maple Leafs and Pittsburgh Penguins in the early 1980s.

Career statistics

References

External links

1984 births
Living people
Asiago Hockey 1935 players
Barrie Colts players
Canadian ice hockey defencemen
Cardiff Devils players
EC VSV players
Florida Everblades players
HDD Olimpija Ljubljana players
Ice hockey people from Simcoe County
Lillehammer IK players
Mississauga IceDogs players
North Bay Centennials players
Rochester Americans players
Rockford IceHogs (UHL) players
Saginaw Spirit players
Sportspeople from Barrie
Storhamar Dragons players
Canadian expatriate sportspeople in the United States
Canadian expatriate ice hockey players in Wales
Canadian expatriate ice hockey players in Austria
Canadian expatriate ice hockey players in Slovenia
Canadian expatriate ice hockey players in Norway
Canadian expatriate ice hockey players in Italy